Biagio Molino or Biaggio Molina or Biageo de Molina (1380–1447) was a Roman Catholic prelate who served as Titular Patriarch of Jerusalem (1434–1447), Patriarch of Grado (1427–1434), Archbishop of Zadar (1420–1427), and Bishop of Pula (1410–1420).

Biography
Biagio Molino was born in Venice, Italy in 1380.
On 19 February 1410, he was appointed during the papacy of Pope Gregory XII as Bishop of Pula.
On 4 March 1420, he was appointed during the papacy of Pope Martin V as Archbishop of Zadar.
On 17 October 1427, he was appointed during the papacy of Pope Martin V as Patriarch of Grado.
On 20 October 1434, he was appointed during the papacy of Pope Eugene IV as Titular Patriarch of Jerusalem.
He served as Titular Patriarch of Jerusalem until his death in 1447.
While bishop, he was the principal consecrator of Giacomo Veneri de Racaneto, Archbishop of Dubrovnik (1440).

References

External links and additional sources
 (for Chronology of Bishops) 
 (for Chronology of Bishops) 
 (for Chronology of Bishops) 
 (for Chronology of Bishops) 
 (for Chronology of Bishops) 
 (for Chronology of Bishops) 
 (for Chronology of Bishops) 
 (for Chronology of Bishops) 

15th-century Italian Roman Catholic bishops
Bishops appointed by Pope Gregory XII
Bishops appointed by Pope Martin V
Bishops appointed by Pope Eugene IV
1380 births
1447 deaths
Latin Patriarchs of Jerusalem